The Diocese of Wellington is one of the thirteen dioceses and hui amorangi of the Anglican Church in Aotearoa, New Zealand and Polynesia.  The diocese covers the area between the bottom of the North Island of New Zealand up to the area of Mount Ruapehu.

There are over 90 parishes and mission districts within the diocese of Wellington.

The diocese's first bishop, Charles Abraham, was consecrated in 1858. The seat of the Bishop of Wellington is at the Wellington Cathedral of St Paul. An attempt was made in the 21st General Synod (1919) to make the Bishop of Wellington ex officio Primate and Metropolitan; this failed in the 22nd Synod (1922).

The Archbishop David Moxon announced on 29 April 2012 that Justin Duckworth had been elected as the 11th Bishop of Wellington. Duckworth was installed as the 11th. Bishop of Wellington in the afternoon of 30 June 2012 in an enthronement service.

The diocese celebrated its sesquicentenary in 2008; the celebrations included pilgrimages throughout the diocese.

Old St Paul's, the second Church of St Paul in Wellington, which was the pro-cathedral church for the Anglican Diocese of Wellington from 1866 to 1964 is still consecrated, but is now owned by Heritage New Zealand (formerly the New Zealand Historic Places Trust). The first parish church for the early settlers, dedicated to St Paul, was behind where the Beehive stands today: a replica stands at the Bolton Street entrance to an early cemetery for Wellington, alongside the original sextons cottage.
The current Wellington Cathedral church for the Diocese was dedicated, partially completed, in the name of St Paul in 1964.  Completion was in stages and in 2001 it was consecrated.

Bishops of Wellington
4 September 18581 June 1870 (res.): Charles Abraham (first Bishop of Wellington; previously Archdeacon of Waitemata)
1870–1893 Octavius Hadfield (previously Archdeacon of Kapiti; also Primate of New Zealand, 1890–1893)
1895–1911 Frederic Wallis (afterwards Archdeacon of Wilts UK, 1911)
1911–1936 Thomas Sprott
1936–1946 St Barbe Holland (afterwards Dean of Norwich, UK)
1947–1960 Reginald Owen (also Archbishop of New Zealand, 1952–1960)
1960–1972 Henry Baines (translated from Singapore)
1973–1986 Edward Norman (previously Archdeacon of Wellington and vicar of the Parish of Karori (Church of St Mary)
1986–1997 Brian Davis (translated from Waikato; also Archbishop of New Zealand)
1998–2012 Tom Brown (previously Archdeacon of Belmont and vicar of Lower Hutt (Church of St James))
2012–present Justin Duckworth

Assistant Bishops of Wellington
 E. J. Rich
 1991–1998 Tom Brown
23 February 19911999: Brian Carrell, Bishop in Palmerston North
1997–?: Hāpai Winiata
 2 June 20172022Eleanor Sanderson<Bishop of Hull>

Archdeaconries
The Wellington Diocese today is divided into seven archdeaconries: Wanganui, Manawatu, Kapiti, Wairarapa, Belmont, Ohariu, and Wellington. In 1866, there was one archdeaconry: O. Hadfield was Archdeacon of Kapiti. In 1887, Arthur Stock had been Archdeacon of Kapiti since 1870. In 1909, Charles Coleridge Harper (a grandson of bishop Henry Harper) was Archdeacon of Wanganui.

References

External links
 Anglican Diocese of Wellington
 Te Ara: Encyclopedia of New Zealand 1966 - Octavius Hadfield
 Dictionary of New Zealand Biography - Octavius Hadfield
 Diocese of Wellington

Wellington